Trimdon Colliery is a village in County Durham, in England. It is situated a few miles to the west of Hartlepool, and a short distance to the north of Trimdon. Its most famous resident was the former Prime Minister, Tony Blair.

References

External links

Villages in County Durham
Trimdon